The 22nd General Assembly of Prince Edward Island represented the colony of Prince Edward Island between March 3, 1863, and 1867.

The Assembly sat at the pleasure of the Governor of Prince Edward Island, George Dundas.   Thomas Heath Haviland was elected speaker.

John Hamilton Gray was Premier.

Members

The members of the Prince Edward Island Legislature after the general election of 1863 were:

External links 
 Journal of the House of Assembly of Prince Edward Island (1863)

Terms of the General Assembly of Prince Edward Island
1863 establishments in Prince Edward Island
1867 disestablishments in Prince Edward Island